The list of ship commissionings in 2005 includes a chronological list of all ships commissioned in 2005.


See also 

2005
 Ship commissionings